José Pablo García Castany (30 August 1948 – 16 June 2022), known as just García Castany, was a Spanish football player and coach. He played midfielder for CD Condal, FC Barcelona, and Real Zaragoza. With Barcelona, he won the Copa del Rey in 1971.

References

1948 births
2022 deaths
Spanish footballers
Association football midfielders
La Liga players
Segunda División players
FC Barcelona players
CD Condal players
CD Puertollano footballers
CA Osasuna players
Girona FC players
Girona FC managers
Real Zaragoza players
Spanish football managers
Sportspeople from Girona